is a Japanese manga series written and illustrated by Yoshikazu Yasuhiko. It is a retelling of the story from the 1979 anime television series Mobile Suit Gundam, of which Yasuhiko was the original character designer.

An original video animation adaptation of the manga, focusing on the stories of Casval Rem Deikun (more famously known as Char Aznable) and his sister Artesia (aka Sayla Mass), produced by Sunrise was released between 2015 and 2018 in six parts. Yasuhiko was the chief director of the adaptation, with Sunrise veteran Takashi Imanishi as director, and Katsuyuki Sumisawa as the scriptwriter. A 13-episode anime television recompilation of the OVAs aired on NHK General TV in 2019.

Plot

The plot of the manga follows somewhat closely to the plot of the original series. It is the year Universal Century 0079, and the eighth month of a vicious war between the Earth Federation and a breakaway nation of space colonists, the Principality of Zeon. The story follows the crew of the warship White Base, as they fight to ferry the experimental RX-78-02 Gundam mobile suit to the Federation base at Jaburo.

Although for the most part faithful to the original series' plot (all of the major events unfold in mostly the same manner as the TV series, though often in different locales), Yasuhiko has taken the liberty of changing certain elements in the series universe, giving a different character to the series and the struggle that unfolds. Primary among these is the presence of mobile suits in both sides well before the conflict begins—in fact, in the flashback sequences, both the Earth Federation Forces and Zeon use Guntanks in 0068, and they and the Guncannon mobile suit are described as "obsolete" and fit for target practice in the first volume (in the TV series proper, both the RX-75 and the RX-77 were as new as the RX-78 Gundam itself, designed to serve as long- and mid-range fire support units).

Other differences concern the breadth of the Gundam's journey to Jaburo. Where it's implied that the White Base's journey to Jaburo in the series was pretty much a circumnavigation of the globe unconnected to many real-world locations, Yasuhiko's journey places the White Base's landfall near Los Angeles, the headquarters of Garma Zabi (in the series, Garma was based out of a generic "New York" — Origin in fact states the Zeon occupation HQ as Los Angeles City Hall, with Garma residing in Hollywood/Beverly Hills) and moves the craft steadily to the southeast, and down the South American coast—past Caracas, Venezuela and through Machu Picchu and into Brazil, where Jaburo, the headquarters of the Earth Federation, is located.  This retelling cuts out some of the more trivial encounters seen in the original series, while keeping and expanding on important characters like Garma, Ramba Ral, and the Black Tri-Stars. As a direct result the events of Operation Odessa which takes place around the Ukrainian city of the same name, occur after the events of Jaburo, as opposed to the anime where they occur before.

Yasuhiko further finally tells the entire back story of the Gundam universe in the manga. After the successful defense of Jaburo, the story diverts into a very in-depth flashback, told primarily from the viewpoints of Sayla and Char (with a secondary thread being told from Amuro's POV) recounting the downfall of Zeon Zum Deikun, the rise of the Zabi family, the construction of Side 7 and the research into mobile suits, and leading up through a decade until the launching of the One Year War. It also goes into detail answering many previously unanswered questions such as the appearance of heretofore unseen Zeon mobile suits prior to the MS-05 Zaku I, how Dozle Zabi received his trademark scars and even the origin of Casval Deikun/Edward Mass' "Char Aznable" identity.   Volume fourteen, deals with the Battle of Loum at the beginning of the One Year War, and is the last piece of the in-depth flashback.

The story shifted back on track to the original anime's storyline, featuring the White Base's involvement in the Federation's Operation Odessa, as well as including Kai Shiden's encounter with Miharu.  Afterwards, the manga deals with the end of the Odessa campaign and, in another departure from the series, takes M'Quve and his Gyan out of the picture before he has a chance to confront the Gundam.

Media

Manga
The series was first serialized in the magazine Gundam Ace in Japan from 2001 to 2011 and has been collected in 24 tankōbon volumes, with the last volume containing extra side stories. Both are published by Kadokawa Shoten under their Kadokawa Comics A imprint. Viz Comics attempted to translate the series and publish it in America in a quarterly, perfect-bound magazine-sized format, although low sales very quickly ended the American run.

Although Viz released 12 volumes of its English translation, they do not correspond with the Japanese volumes.  The English volumes, with an average length between 100-130 pages were about half of that of the equivalent Japanese tankōbon, which ran anywhere between 200-270.  The length varied as some contained just four chapters, some contained an additional "special" shorter side story, and others contained a full five chapters.  The reason for this could be that the Japanese serialization focused on keeping distinct chapters.  As a result, the English serialization ended up having a higher price point than its Japanese equivalent with only roughly half of the content.  The Viz release stopped near the end of volume six in the Japanese version.

The popularity of the manga in Japan has led to the release of aizōban or Collector's Edition versions.  Each collector's edition combines two tankōbon volumes (combining the beginning and end sections into one), creating large, leather bound, hardback editions with dozens of pages printed in full color, as opposed to about 5 pages per tankōbon.

At Otakon 2012, North American publisher Vertical announced that it will publish an English language adaptation of the series in hardcover format similar to the Aizoban editions. The first volume was released on the March 26, 2013 and the series was completed with the publishing of the 12th volume on December 17, 2015.

A spinoff of the manga, titled , was written by Junji Ōno and  serialized in Gundam Ace from June 25, 2016 to May 25, 2019, 10 years after the original manga's serialization and collected into five tankobon volumes. The manga serves as a prequel to episode 15 of the original TV series.

Tankōbon volume list

Aizōban volume list

MSD: Cucuruz Doan's Island volume list

Anime

Sunrise announced in June 2011 that an anime adaptation of Gundam: The Origin was in production. In March 2014, it was announced it will be a four-episode OVA series with event screenings at Japanese theaters, in celebration of the 35th anniversary of Gundam, and centering on the stories of Casval Deikun and his sister Artesia. The first episode, titled , premiered in limited Japanese theaters on February 28, 2015.  Sunrise produced an English dub recorded at NYAV Post for the first time since Bandai retired their Gundam license. Another two-episode OVA series, Mobile Suit Gundam: The Origin: Loum Arc, was released in 2017 and 2018.

A 13-episode anime television recompilation of the OVA series aired from April 29 to August 12, 2019 under the title . Sugizo produced the theme songs. His band Luna Sea performed the three opening themes, the first being , the second , and the third a cover of TM Network's , the ending theme of 1988's Mobile Suit Gundam: Char's Counterattack. For the ending themes he decided to collaborate with female singers. The first ending theme is a cover of Daisuke Inoue's , the theme song of 1982's Mobile Suit Gundam III: Encounters in Space, by Sugizo feat. Glim Spanky. The second ending theme is a cover of Hiroko Moriguchi's , the second opening theme song of 1985's Mobile Suit Zeta Gundam, by Sugizo feat. KOM_I (Wednesday Campanella). The third ending theme is the new song "A Red Ray" by Sugizo feat. miwa. The last is a cover of his and Morrie's co-composition  by Sugizo feat. Aina the End (BiSH). The English dub for the Advent of the Red Comet TV recompilation series was broadcast in the United States on Adult Swim's Toonami programming block from July 7 to October 6, 2019.

Notes

References

External links

Official Gundam: The Origin website 

2019 anime television series debuts
2002 manga
Origin
Kadokawa Shoten manga
Shōnen manga
Toonami
Vertical (publisher) titles
Viz Media manga